USS Linnet (AM-76), was a  of the United States Navy during World War II.

Laid down on 18 June 1928 as the M/V Georgetown by Bath Iron Works Corp., Bath, Maine, for F. J. O'Hara and Sons, Inc. of Boston, Massachusetts. The ship was launched on 15 December 1928, and delivered on 19 December 1928. Renamed Linnet on 14 August 1940. Acquired by the U.S. Navy on 4 September 1940, conversion to a minesweeper began in September 1940 at the Bethlehem Steel Co. of East Boston, Massachusetts. Commissioned as USS Linnet (AM-76) on 3 March 1941, conversion was completed in March 1941. Reclassified as an Unclassified Miscellaneous Auxiliary IX-166 on 20 April 1944.

World War II Atlantic operations  
Assigned to the Mine Warfare School, Yorktown, Virginia, Linnet engaged in experiments and training in the intricacies of mine operations. Upon completion of training in the spring 1942, the minesweeper sailed to join Fleet operations in the South Atlantic.

South Atlantic operations 
Based at Recife, Brazil, Linnet played an important role in harbor clearing operations to permit the free movement of ships from that port. She regained in Brazilian waters until 22 February 1944, when she sailed for Norfolk, Virginia, arriving there 17 March. Linnet was reclassified IX-168 on 20 April for possible use as a small cargo ship.

End-of-War deactivation 
Plans were changed, however, and she was decommissioned on 18 December 1944 at Boston, Massachusetts. Returned to the War Shipping Administration on 31 July 1945, and converted to mercantile service and renamed M/V Cambridge. Fate unknown.

References

External links
 
 Photo gallery At Naval Historical Center

 

Ships built in Bath, Maine
1928 ships
Kite-class minesweepers
World War II minesweepers of the United States